The 1955 Washington University Bears football team was an American football team that represented Washington University in St. Louis as an independent during the 1955 college football season. Led by third-year head coach Carl Snavely, the Bears compiled a record of 5–4.

Schedule

References

Washington University
Washington University Bears football seasons
Washington University Bears football